The president of Republika Srpska is the highest executive authority in Republika Srpska, an entity in Bosnia and Herzegovina. It is one of the executive authorities, along with the Government of Republika Srpska. The president of Republika Srpska is directly elected for a term of four years, along with two vice presidents from different constituent nations (Serbs, Croats and Bosniaks). None of them can be from a same constituent nation at the same time. The president's residence is in Banja Luka.

The first president was Radovan Karadžić of the Serb Democratic Party, elected to the post in 1992, who led Republika Srpska during the Bosnian War and who was later sentenced to 40 years in prison for Srebrenica genocide, war crimes and crimes against humanity. Milorad Dodik of the Alliance of Independent Social Democrats took the office in 2022.

Powers
According to the Constitution of Republika Srpska, the president represents Republika Srpska and expresses its unity. As Republika Srpska functions as a parliamentary system, the president has very limited powers. The president does have the power to:

Nominate a candidate for prime minister to the National Assembly;
Nominate candidates for president and judges of the Constitutional Court, on a proposal of the High Judicial and Prosecutorial Council, to the National Assembly;
Declares laws by a decree;
Gives pardons;
Gives decorations and recognitions as determined by a law;
Manages other duties according to the Constitution.

If the National Assembly is unable to make a session due to a state of emergency, the president, after obtaining an opinion from the Government, declares a state of emergency and orders measures for removing the state of emergency. The president, by his own initiative or on Government's suggestion, declares acts from the jurisdiction of the National Assembly during war circumstances or an immediate threat of war; the acts must be brought for a confirmation by the National Assembly the very moment when the Assembly is able to have a session.

The president can ask the Government to express its attitude on certain matters of the significance for the Republic, call a session of the Government, or put matters from Government's jurisdiction on an agenda.

Presidents

Latest election

See also
List of presidents of Republika Srpska
Presidency of Bosnia and Herzegovina
President of the Federation of Bosnia and Herzegovina

References

Politics of Republika Srpska